Michael Davis (born 19 January 1961) is a former Australian rules footballer who played with Essendon and the Sydney Swans in the Victorian Football League (VFL).

Davis, who was recruited from St Bernard's, was a rover and wingman. A left footer, Davis debuted for Essendon in their six point win over Fitzroy at Windy Hill in the 1980 VFL season. He didn't play again until 1982 and his other two appearances came in 1983, when he was also a member of Essendon's reserves premiership team. In 1984 he played one senior game for the Sydney Swans, their round nine win over Geelong.

References

1961 births
Australian rules footballers from Victoria (Australia)
Essendon Football Club players
Sydney Swans players
Living people